The German Cricket Federation is the national governing body for cricket in Germany. It is commonly known as the DCB. Its current headquarters is in Buxtehude, Germany. The association is responsible for men's, women's and junior cricket across Germany and oversees six regional cricket associations across the country.

The DCB was created in 1988 in a document signed by eight German cricket clubs. In 1991, the DCB became an Affiliate member of the International Cricket Council. In 1999 it graduated to the level of an Associate, after recommendation by Namibia and Pakistan. It is also a member of the European Cricket Council. By May 2021, almost 150 clubs were playing cricket in Germany.

History
Germany's first separate cricket body, the Deutscher Cricket Bund (DCB), representing teams from Berlin, Nuremberg, Furth, Düsseldorf, Frankfurt, Mannheim and Hamburg was formed in 1912. The original federation did not last and it was 76 years later that the modern DCB was formed.

Today, there are over 100 cricket clubs across Germany, with nearly 3000 players registered in total. The DCB has a budget of about €220,000 ($241,000) per year, most of which comes from the ICC. With an influx of new cricketers migrating to Germany from Asia, especially Afghan refugees, and an increase in junior players learning the game inside in Germany, the number of cricketers registered with the DCB is expected to continue to rise.

See also 
 Germany national cricket team

References

External links
 
Cricinfo-Germany

Cricket in Germany
Cricket administration
Cricket
Sports organizations established in 1988
1988 establishments in Germany